Richard C. Howard is the former town manager of Winchester, Massachusetts and Mayor of Malden.

References

Year of birth missing (living people)
Living people
Massachusetts city managers
Mayors of Malden, Massachusetts